Sophon Hayachanta (born 1933) is a Thai civil engineer and amateur footballer. He attended Debsirin School, and competed in the men's tournament at the 1956 Summer Olympics.

References

External links
 

1933 births
Living people
Sophon Hayachanta
Sophon Hayachanta
Sophon Hayachanta
Footballers at the 1956 Summer Olympics
Place of birth missing (living people)
Association footballers not categorized by position